Grovania may refer to:

Grovania, Georgia, an unincorporated community
Grovania, Pennsylvania, an unincorporated community